The 1966 Asian Games medal table is a list of nations ranked by the medals won by their athletes during the multi-sport event, being held in Bangkok, Thailand from December 9, 1966, to December 20, 1966. The National Olympic Committees are ranked by number of gold medals first, with number of silver then bronze medals acting as the rank decider in the event of equal standing. Other alternative methods of ranking include listing by total medals.

Medal table

References

Overall Medal Standings - Bangkok 1966

Medal table
1966